Reiner of Meissen, also noted as Rainer, Reginbert, Rogmer or Reinbert (died 1066), was Bishop of Meissen from 1065 to 1066. He was consecrated by Werner of Steusslingen, Archbishop of Magdeburg.

References

Roman Catholic bishops of Meissen
1066 deaths
Year of birth unknown